Pakala mandal is one of the 34 mandals in Tirupati district of the Indian state of Andhra Pradesh. It is under the administration of Tirupati revenue division and the headquarters are located at Pakala.

History 
Pakala mandal used to be a part of Chittoor district and was made part of the newly formed Tirupati district on 4 April 2022.

Geography 
The mandal is bounded by Chandragiri, Irala, Penumuru, Pulicherla and Puthalapattu mandals.

Demographics 

It had a sex ratio of 1022. Scheduled Castes and Scheduled Tribes made up 13,122 and 1,474 of the population respectively. It had a literacy rate of 75.16% with 84.08% among males and 66.54% among females.

Administration 
Pakala mandal is a part of the Tirupati revenue division. The headquarters are located at Pakala.

Politics 
Pakala mandal is one of the 7 mandals under Chandragiri Assembly constituency, which in turn is a part of Chittoor Lok Sabha constituency of Andhra Pradesh. , the mandal has 40,655 eligible voters with 20,064 male and 20,591 female voters. Chevireddy Bhaskar Reddy is representing the Chandragiri constituency as the Member of the Legislative Assembly (MLA) in Andhra Pradesh Legislative Assembly, and N. Reddeppa is representing the Chittoor constituency as the Member of Parliament (MP) in Lok Sabha.

References 

Mandals in Tirupati district